Beckett were an English hard rock band formed in Newcastle upon Tyne in 1970. The band released one self-titled album in 1974 and disbanded shortly thereafter. Original singer Rob Turner was killed in a car crash and replaced by Terry Wilson-Slesser, who would later go on to perform with Back Street Crawler and then Geordie whose previous front man Brian Johnson left to join AC/DC in 1980.

Iron Maiden copyright lawsuit

In 2017, Beckett songwriter Brian Ingham sued Iron Maiden for copyright infringement over two popular songs, "Hallowed Be Thy Name" and "The Nomad", which lifted musical sections and lyrics from the song "Life's Shadow". Iron Maiden manager Rod Smallwood was the agent for Beckett and a teenage Steve Harris saw the band play this song live. Harris and Dave Murray settled with one of the credited songwriters, Robert Barton. Ingham was unaware of the matter until 2011 and Barton claimed to be the sole songwriter during the original settlement. Iron Maiden stopped performing Hallowed Be Thy Name on their 2017 tour as a result. The issue was settled out of court in March 2018.

Band members 

Terry Wilson-Slesser - vocals
Robert Barton - guitar, vocals
Arthur Ramm - guitar, vocals
Keith Fisher - drums
Ian Murray - bass
Kenny Mountain - guitar, keyboards, vocals
Tim Hinkley - keyboards
Rob Turner vocals
Les Tones - guitar
Alan Craig - drums

Discography

Albums
 Beckett (1974, Raft Records)

Singles 
 Little Girl (1973, Raft Records)
 My Lady (1974, Raft Records)
 Wishing Well (1989, Beckett Records)

References 

English hard rock musical groups
Musical groups from Newcastle upon Tyne
Musical groups established in 1970